Salvador José Milhazes Agra (born 11 November 1991) is a Portuguese professional footballer who plays for Boavista F.C. as a winger.

In a journeyman career, he made over 200 Primeira Liga appearances for Olhanense, Braga, Académica, Nacional, Aves, Tondela and Boavista, while also being on the books of Benfica. Abroad, he had brief spells in Italy, Spain and Poland.

Club career

Early years and Olhanense
Born in Vila do Conde, Agra began his career with Varzim SC, joining the club's youth ranks at the age of 13. He made his senior debut in 2010–11, being a very important attacking unit – only one league game missed – as the Póvoa de Varzim team was finally relegated from the Segunda Liga. He scored his one goal on 21 May 2011 in the penultimate round of the season, opening a 1–2 home loss against C.F. Os Belenenses.

Agra signed for S.C. Olhanense in the summer of 2011, penning a three-year contract with the Algarve side on 8 July. He made his Primeira Liga debut on 13 August, playing 15 minutes in a 1–1 draw at Sporting CP. His first goal was on 11 September as a substitute in a 1–2 home defeat to C.D. Feirense.

Betis
In late January 2012, Agra joined Spanish club Real Betis who paid €300,000 for 60% of his rights, but stayed with Olhanense until the end of the campaign. He appeared in just 14 competitive matches during his spell in Andalusia – scoring his only goal in a 2–4 La Liga home loss against Atlético Madrid– being successively loaned to A.C. Siena, S.C. Braga and Académica de Coimbra.

While on loan to Braga, Agra was sent off for the only time in his career in a goalless draw to rivals Vitória S.C. on 7 December 2014 for an altercation with Hernâni Fortes, who was also dismissed. He made four appearances from the bench in their run to the final of the Taça de Portugal; in that match, on 31 May, he missed the decisive penalty in the shootout as they lost to Sporting.

Later years
On 28 June 2015, Agra cut ties with Betis and signed a four-year contract with C.D. Nacional. On 1 July 2017, after the latter's relegation, he agreed to a three-year deal with Portuguese champions S.L. Benfica; he spent his first year on loan, to C.D. Aves and Granada CF (the latter in the Spanish Segunda División).

For 2018–19, Agra joined Cádiz CF from Spain on a one-year loan. In the following transfer window, however, he terminated his link with Benfica and moved to Legia Warsaw in the Polish Ekstraklasa on a two-and-a-half-year contract. He quit the club a year early on 7 May 2020, having made only nine goalless appearances, weeks before they secured the league title.

Agra returned to Portugal on 14 August 2020, signing a two-year contract with C.D. Tondela. He missed only five league games in his spell at the Estádio João Cardoso and scored nine times, including two on 16 January 2021 in a 3–1 home win over Boavista FC. On 22 May 2022, days after the team's relegation, he captained the side in the 3–1 loss to FC Porto in the domestic cup final; he had featured six times up to the decisive match, and scored an added-time winner in a 2–1 victory against amateurs A.D. Camacha in the third round.

On 11 June 2022, Agra agreed to a two-year deal at Boavista.

International career
Agra earned 15 caps for Portugal at youth level, including eight for the under-21 team. His first arrived on 5 September 2011, when he played the last 12 minutes of a 1–0 friendly win over France.

Agra was also one of three over-23 players for the Olympic team in 2016.

Personal life
Agra's cousin, Nélson, was a teammate at Varzim. Also born in 1991, he spent most of his professional career at the club.

Club statistics

Honours
Aves
Taça de Portugal: 2017–18

Legia Warsaw
Ekstraklasa: 2019–20

References

External links

1991 births
Living people
People from Vila do Conde
Sportspeople from Porto District
Portuguese footballers
Association football wingers
Primeira Liga players
Liga Portugal 2 players
Varzim S.C. players
S.C. Olhanense players
S.C. Braga players
Associação Académica de Coimbra – O.A.F. players
S.C. Braga B players
C.D. Nacional players
S.L. Benfica footballers
C.D. Aves players
C.D. Tondela players
Boavista F.C. players
La Liga players
Segunda División players
Real Betis players
Granada CF footballers
Cádiz CF players
Serie A players
A.C.N. Siena 1904 players
Ekstraklasa players
Legia Warsaw players
Portugal youth international footballers
Portugal under-21 international footballers
Olympic footballers of Portugal
Footballers at the 2016 Summer Olympics
Portuguese expatriate footballers
Expatriate footballers in Spain
Expatriate footballers in Italy
Expatriate footballers in Poland
Portuguese expatriate sportspeople in Spain
Portuguese expatriate sportspeople in Italy
Portuguese expatriate sportspeople in Poland